Erlan Tynymbaiuly Karin (born on 26 May 1976 in Aksukent, Sayram District) is a Kazakh politician who is the current State Counsellor of Kazakhstan.

He was born on May 26, 1976 in the village of Aksukent, and comes from the Adai clan of the Bayuly. In 1997, he graduated from the Faculty of History of Aktobe State University and in 1999 from Al-Farabi Kazakh National University. From 1996-1998, he worked as a teacher of history and geography at a secondary school in Aktobe. On April 5, 2019, he was appointed Advisor to the President, later being promoted to assistant the following year. On January 5, 2022, he was appointed State Secretary of the Republic of Kazakhstan, a position which was changed on 14 June to State Counsellor.

He speaks Kazakh, Russian and English. He names Alikhan Bukeikhanov, John Kennedy and Nursultan Nazarbayev as ideal political figures. He is married and has six children.

Awards 

Order of Kurmet
Medal "10 years of Astana"
Medal "20 years of Independence of the Republic of Kazakhstan"
Medal "20 years of the Armed Forces of the Republic of Kazakhstan"
 "Honorary sports worker"

References 

Living people
1976 births
People from Turkistan Region